Ahmed Fadzil (born 6 June 1959) is a Malaysian field hockey player. He competed at the 1984 Summer Olympics and the 1992 Summer Olympics.

References

External links
 

1959 births
Living people
Malaysian male field hockey players
Olympic field hockey players of Malaysia
Field hockey players at the 1984 Summer Olympics
Field hockey players at the 1992 Summer Olympics
Place of birth missing (living people)
Asian Games medalists in field hockey
Asian Games bronze medalists for Malaysia
Medalists at the 1982 Asian Games
Medalists at the 1990 Asian Games
Field hockey players at the 1982 Asian Games
Field hockey players at the 1990 Asian Games